The 2nd Canadian Parliament was in session from March 5, 1873, until January 2, 1874. The membership was set by the 1872 federal election from July 20 to October 12, 1872, and it changed only somewhat due to resignations and by-elections until it was dissolved prior to the 1874 election. Among the by-elections were the first election of PEI MPs, PEI joining Confederation in 1873.

It was first controlled by a Conservative/Liberal-Conservative majority under Prime Minister Sir John A. Macdonald and the 1st Canadian Ministry.  The Official Opposition was the Liberal Party, led by Alexander Mackenzie.  After a scandal in the Conservative Party, the Liberals took power, forming the 2nd Canadian Ministry.  Alexander Mackenzie, now Prime Minister, immediately called an election.

The Speaker was James Cockburn.  See also List of Canadian electoral districts 1872-1873 for a list of the ridings in this parliament.

The unusual case of a new party taking control of the government between elections has only happened in the federal government twice; the other occasion was in the 15th Canadian parliament.

There were 2 sessions of the 2nd Parliament:

List of members
Following is a full list of members of the second parliament listed first by province, then by electoral district.

Electoral districts denoted by an asterisk (*) indicates that district was represented by two members.

British Columbia

Manitoba

New Brunswick

Two MPs recontested their seats in byelections, and were reelected.

Albert James Smith was reelected in Westmorland on November 28, 1873.
Isaac Burpee was reelected in the City and County of St. John on December 1, 1873.

Nova Scotia

Two MPs recontested their seats in byelections, and were reelected.

Hugh McDonald was reelected in Antigonish on July 7, 1873, on being named Minister of  Militia and Defence.
Thomas Coffin was reelected in Shelburne on July 11, 1873, on being named Receiver-General  of Canada.

Ontario

Five MPs recontested their seats in byelections, and were reelected.

Thomas Nicholson Gibbs was reelected in Ontario South on July 7, 1873.
Alexander Mackenzie was reelected in Lambton on November 25, 1873.
Donald Alexander MacDonald was reelected in Glengarry on November 26, 1873.
Richard John Cartwright was reelected in Lennox on December 3, 1873.
Edward Blake was reelected in Bruce South on December 4, 1873.

Quebec

Three MPs recontested their seats in byelections, and were reelected.

Télesphore Fournier was reelected in Bellechasse on November 27, 1873, after being named Minister of Inland Revenue.
Théodore Robitaille was reelected in Bonaventure on February 15, 1873, after being named Receiver-General.
Antoine Aimé Dorion was reelected in Napierville on November 27, 1873, after being named Minister of Justice and Attorney General.

Prince Edward Island
Prince Edward Island joined Canada on July 1, 1873. By-elections for the House of Commons were held on September 29, 1873.

References

By-elections

References 

02nd Canadian Parliament
1873 establishments in Canada
1874 disestablishments in Canada
1873 in Canada
1874 in Canada